Philip Charles MacKenzie  (born Philip Charles Harris on May 7, 1946) is an American actor and television director. He is best known for his role as Donald Maltby on Brothers, and as Ted Nichols on Open House, which he worked on with his current wife, Alison La Placa.

Career
MacKenzie was born in Brooklyn, New York. He made his on-screen debut in Sidney Lumet's 1975 crime drama Dog Day Afternoon. He then began doing numerous television guest roles and co-starring roles in afterschool specials and made-for-TV movies. MacKenzie guest starred on such shows as Three's Company, Baa Baa Black Sheep, Lou Grant (which co-starred his future Brothers castmate, Robert Walden), The Love Boat, The Jeffersons, Diff'rent Strokes, The Facts of Life, and WKRP in Cincinnati. In 1980, he appeared as Dr. LaFleur in The Heartbreak Winner, an ABC Afterschool Special episode.

That same year, MacKenzie was cast in the pilot of a series proposed for NBC's 1980 fall schedule, The Six O'Clock Follies, a period piece set in 1967 Saigon. After a single preview telecast in April 1980, the network passed on the series' development. MacKenzie then landed his first regular role on the short-lived CBS sitcom Making the Grade in the spring of 1982. Making the Grade was also the first series role for actor George Wendt, with whom MacKenzie worked later that year when he did a guest appearance on "Coach's Daughter", an episode of NBC's Cheers.

In 1984, MacKenzie began in the featured role of flamboyant, effeminate Donald Maltby on the Showtime sitcom Brothers. The series portrayed positive gay role models, particularly in the character of Cliff Waters (Paul Regina). MacKenzie's portrayal of resident "queen" and Cliff's unlikely friend Donald provided a sharp contrast to Cliff's masculinity. After the first season concluded, MacKenzie won his first CableACE Award for Best Supporting Actor in a Comedy Series. He was nominated for the same award again in 1987, following the show's third season. He continued doing guest roles in between the shooting of Brothers on shows such as Newhart and St. Elsewhere. Also in 1987, MacKenzie began directing selected episodes of Brothers. Since that time, he has directed episodes of more than 30 TV series, including Roseanne, Suddenly Susan, and According to Jim. In 1986, he appeared in the TV film  Blind Justice, starring Tim Matheson.

In 1989, just as Brothers was ending a five-season run, MacKenzie made a guest appearance on the Fox dramedy series Duet. He appeared as Ted Nichols, a real estate mogul who proposes a business partnership with snobbish yuppie Linda Phillips (played by his current real-life wife, series regular Alison LaPlaca). Upon the cancelation of Duet, LaPlaca and MacKenzie's characters were spun off into its sequel comedy series, Open House, which centered on Linda and Ted's new venture in real estate. Premiering in August 1989, Open House lasted only a single season. Midway through the 1990-91 season, MacKenzie joined the cast of ABC's Miller/Boyett sitcom Going Places as talk show producer Arnie Ross. MacKenzie was reunited with his Brothers co-star Hallie Todd, who had been one of the four main leads on Going Places since its debut. A few months after his arrival, the series was canceled.

Subsequently, MacKenzie switched his focus to directing but continued to do occasional guest appearances.

Personal life
MacKenzie was married to actress Linda Carlson  from whom he later was divorced. He has been married to actress Alison LaPlaca since 1992.

Partial filmography

References

External links
 

1946 births
Living people
People from Brooklyn
Male actors from New York City
American male film actors
American male television actors
American television directors
20th-century American male actors
21st-century American male actors